Charles Theodore may refer to:

 Charles Theodore, Elector of Bavaria (1724–1799)
 Charles Theodore, Prince of Salm (1645–1710)